To the Loveless is the seventh studio album by Japanese electronica/rock duo Boom Boom Satellites, their first full original album release since 2007. It is sold as both a regular CD version and a limited edition containing a DVD with the music videos for "Back on My Feet" and "Drain", a short documentary on the release of "Back on My Feet", and a live performance at Shibuya O-East. It was released on May 26, 2010. "Back On My Feet" was used as an alternate opening theme for Xam'd: Lost Memories; "Stay" is used in Japanese commercials for the Sony BRAVIA that feature footballer Atsuto Uchida.

Track list

Personnel
Credits adapted from liner notes.
 Design, Artwork – Noriyuki Matsuo
 Drums [Additional] – Yoko Fukuda
 Mastered By – Ted Jensen
 Photography By, Artwork – Boom Boom Satellites
 Producer, Written-By – Boom Boom Satellites

References

External links
 Boom Boom Satellites official website

2010 albums
Boom Boom Satellites albums